Live at the Checkerboard Lounge, Chicago 1981 is a concert video and live album by American blues musician Muddy Waters and members of the English rock band the Rolling Stones. It was recorded on 22 November 1981 by David Hewitt on the Record Plant Black Truck, mixed by Bob Clearmountain, and released on 10 July 2012.

The Checkerboard Lounge was a blues club in Bronzeville, on the South Side of Chicago, which was established in 1972 by Buddy Guy and L.C. Thurman.

Track listing

CD
Introductions – 1:44
"You Don't Have to Go" – 5:43	
"Baby Please Don't Go" – 11:00	
"Hoochie Coochie Man" – 4:18	
"Long Distance Call" – 4:49	
"Mannish Boy" – 10:25	
"Got My Mojo Workin'" – 3:18	
"Next Time You See Me" – 11:00	
"One Eyed Woman" – 9:44
"Clouds in My Heart" – 6:22
"Champagne and Reefer" – 6:58

DVD
"Sweet Little Angel"
"Flip Flop And Fly"
Muddy Waters Introduction
"You Don’t Have To Go"
"Country Boy"
"Baby Please Don’t Go"
"Hoochie Coochie Man"
"Long Distance Call"
"Mannish Boy"
"Got My Mojo Working"
"Next Time You See Me"
"One Eyed Woman"
"Baby Please Don’t Go (Instrumental)"
"Clouds in My Heart"
"Champagne and Reefer"

Personnel
Muddy Waters and His Band
Muddy Waters – vocals, guitar
 Rick Kreher - guitar
 John Primer – guitar
 Lovie Lee – piano
 Earnest Johnson – bass
 Ray Allison – drums
 George "Mojo" Buford – harmonica
Guests
Mick Jagger – lead vocals
Keith Richards – guitar
Ronnie Wood – guitar
Ian Stewart – piano
Buddy Guy – vocals, guitar
Lefty Dizz – vocals, guitar
Junior Wells – vocals, harmonica
 Nick Charles – bass

Charts

DVD charts

Album charts

References

The Rolling Stones films
The Rolling Stones video albums
The Rolling Stones live albums
Muddy Waters live albums
2012 live albums
2012 video albums
Live video albums
Eagle Rock Entertainment live albums
Eagle Rock Entertainment video albums